Kang Suk-jung (born June 18, 1979) is a South Korean actor.

Television series

References

External links 
 Kang Suk-jung at Happy Actors 
 
 

1979 births
Living people
South Korean male television actors
Cheongju University alumni